La Heredera (The Heiress) is a Mexican telenovela produced by TV Azteca. It marked the third reunion for Silvia Navarro and Sergio Basañez as protagonists. The series was then developed into an American telenovela by the title of American Heiress.

Plot
Meet Maria Claudia(Silvia Navarro). Her father, Don Julian (Guillermo Murray), is the most influential industrialist of the Mexican political scope. Lauro(Victor Huggo Martin), her older brother, incarnates the ambition, greed and resentment, which he uses like arms on his way to the political and economic power. Lorena (Aylin Mujica), her sister, is a talented and beautiful woman and at the same time suffering from culpability and addiction. Octavio(Xavier Massimi), her younger brother, is the minor of the family. Don Julian is on the verge of dying and Maria Claudia (who studies in the USA), returns urgently to Mexico; but on her way she gets in an accident and doesn't arrive. In the middle of her misfortunes, she meets Antonio (Sergio Basañez), an ex-soldier of the Gulf War, and they fall in love. Don Julian survives and the experience of being so close to death will unite more than ever the love of the father and his family. Maria Claudia and Antonio are meant for each other and try to build their happiness; but everything is destroyed with the appearance of Aranza, the woman who years back offered to Antonio something more than just a fleeting love.

Cast

Main cast
Silvia Navarro ... María Claudia Madero Grimaldi  
Sergio Basañez ... Antonio Bautista 
Margarita Gralia ... Gabriela Grimaldi de Madero

Co-Protagonist
Aylín Mújica ... Lorena Madero Grimaldi

Prime actors
Guillermo Murray ... Don Julián Madero Grimaldi
Julieta Egurrola ... Dulce Sergio Torres

Protagonists
Víctor Huggo Martin ... Lauro Madero Grimaldi
Juan Manuel Bernal ... Dionisio
Bruno Bichir ... Santiago
Andrea Noli ... Kauris
Fabián Corres ... Salomon
Xavier Massimi ... Octavio Madero Grimaldi 
Arturo Beristain ... Dr. Alvaro Dominguez

Special participations
Lourdes Villareal 
Gabriela Canudas ... Aranza 
Fidel Garriga 
Enrique Munoz ... Niero
Adriana Louvier ... Linda
Mauricio Valle

Secondary casts
Josafat Luna 
Christian Cataldi 
Ángela Fuste ... Brenda
David Zepeda 
Chucho Reyes 
Arleta Jersioska 
Maria Luisa Vazquez 
Faisy
Carina Sarti 
Larisa Mendizabal
Shirley
Ana Laura Espinosa ... Ponchita 
Beatriz Cecilia
Ana Berumen
Juan Luis Orendain
Fernando Sarfatti 
Angela Sanchez 
Rocio Adame 
Ruli Peterman
Hector Arredondo ... Joaquín Mercader 
Luciana Silveyra 
Luis Rabago ... Orlando Mondragon
Season 2:
Mercedes Pascual
Rene Gatica
Hernan Mendoza
Miguel Rene
Rene Campero

Infant talent
Carlos Padilla ... Ricardo 
Aldo Sebastian de Diego ... Juancito

Special guest stars
Guest Stars in Pilot episode 
Sergio Bustamante 
Evangelina Elizondo 
Margarita Sanz

Tertiary casts
Constantino Costas 
Monica Escamilla ... News Presenter
Mariana Peñalva ... Nurse 
Cynthia Hernandez 
Gonzalo Vega 
Alberto Zeni ... Beto
Jonathan Islas ... Emiliano

Theme song
Title: "Ahora Quien"
Singer: Marc Anthony
Lyrics & Music: Estefano & Julio Reyes
Editor: World Deep Music Sony ATV Pub.
(BMI/BLUE Plantinum Pub. Sony ATV Pub. ASCAP)
Album: Amar Sin Mentiras

Crew
Creator
 Marmol Ramos Luna

Writers
Araceli Monsell
Gerardo Sanchez Luna
Jorge Patino
Guadalupe Obon
Luis Felipe Ybarra
Ivan Arguello

Literary Editor
Bethel Flores

literary counseling
Luis Sierra Mercado

Image Designer
Javier De la Rosa

Wardrobe
Laura Simonin

Ambience
Gerardo Hernandez

Hairstyles
Carmen Retana

Make-up
Alejandra Rodriguez

Props
Guillermo Granados
Ulises Granados

Cinematography Coordinator
Fransisco Garcia

Cinematography Designer
Antonio Novaro

Music effects
Juan Carlos Norona Miranda
Carlos Adrian Norona
Daniel Norona
Guillermo Jacome
Federico Sanchez

Location
Carolina Villanueva

Planning
Ricardo Ruiz

Production manager
Pedro Luevano (Season 1)
Jose Solano (Seasons 2 & 3)

Audio design
Ignacio perez

Director of Artistic Talent
Maria Luisa Anzaldua
Maria Antonio Yanez

Editor
Monica Rodriguez Carrillo

Casting
Fransisco Lugo

Art Director
Jorge Vieira

Second unit Photography Director
Manuel Palacios

Photography Director
Jorge Medina

Associate Producer
Martha Perez-Valdez

Director Assistant
Gladis Genis
Pedro Adame

Second unit Camera Director
Alexis Canizo (Seasons 2 & 3)

Second unit director
Carlos Villegas
Martin Barraza (Seasons 2 & 3)

Scene Director
Maestro Raul Quintanilla (Seasons 2 & 3)

General Director
Luis Manzo (Season 1)
Jorge Rios (Seasons 2 & 3)

Executive Producer
Gerardo Zurita (Seasons 1 & 2)

General Producer
Henry Ramos (Seasons 1 & 2)
Gerardo Zurita (Season 3)

Director of Azteca Novelas
Martin Luna

References

2004 telenovelas
2004 Mexican television series debuts
2005 Mexican television series endings
Mexican telenovelas
Spanish-language telenovelas
TV Azteca telenovelas